Gustavo Rojas Pinilla International Airport (IATA: ADZ, ICAO: SKSP) (formerly Sesquicentenario Airport) is the main airport in the archipelago of San Andrés, Providencia and Santa Catalina, one of the departments of Colombia. It is able to receive large aircraft and to accommodate seasonal and charter flights from different parts of the Americas and Europe.

History 
The air terminal was renamed in honor of General Gustavo Rojas Pinilla (1900–1975), former president of Colombia, who ordered the airport built in the mid-1950s in order to link the Caribbean island with the continental territory of Colombia. The original name of the airport was Sesquicentenario Airport.

Description 
The airport is the sixth busiest airport in Colombia in terms of passengers, with 2,431,766 in 2019. Most of these passengers come from the continental part of the country, due to poor international direct service to the island. Many international tourists have to fly to one of Colombia's or Panama's largest airports (Bogotá, Medellín, Cali, Santa Marta, Cartagena, Barranquilla or Panama City) to be able to reach the islands, although Copa Airlines and American Airlines maintain flights to Panama City and Miami respectively. Aircraft up to the size of the Airbus A340-200 can land at the airport.

Airlines and destinations 

The following airlines operate regular scheduled and charter flights at the airport:

Accidents and incidents
 On August 16, 2010, AIRES Flight 8250, crashed when on approach to Gustavo Rojas Pinilla International Airport. Two of the 129 passengers and crew on board died.
 On September 19, 2013, American Airlines flight 1204 from San Jose, Costa Rica made an emergency landing at the San Andres Airport after reporting smoke in the cockpit. All 179 passengers were said to be safe and continued to Miami, their final destination, on a second plane. The aircraft involved in the incident was a Boeing 757.

See also
Transport in Colombia
List of airports in Colombia

References

External links

San Andrés Airport at OurAirports

Airports in Colombia
Buildings and structures in the Archipelago of San Andrés, Providencia and Santa Catalina